The Eagle 38 is a Dutch sailboat that was designed by Hoek Design as a day sailer and first built in 2019.

Production
The design has been built by Leonardo Yachts of Sneek, Netherlands since 2019 and remains in production.

It was designed to resemble a J-class yacht of the early 20th century, but the manufacturer markets the boat as a daysailer with minimal accommodation for overnight trips.

Design

The Eagle 38 is a recreational keelboat, built predominantly of glassfibre, with wood trim. It has a fractional sloop rig, a sharply raked stem, a raised counter transom, an internally mounted spade-type rudder controlled by a wheel and a fixed fin keel with a weighted bulb. It displaces  and carries  of ballast.

The boat is fitted with a Swedish Volvo D1-13 diesel engine of  powering a saildrive transmission. The holding tank has a  capacity.

The design has below deck sleeping accommodation for three people, with a double "V"-berth in the bow cabin and a straight settee in the main cabin. A galley is optional. The head is located just forward of the companionway steps on the port side. The interior is trimmed with matt varnished mahogany, while the headliner is made from synthetic alcantara. Lighting is provided by LEDs.

For single-handed sailing the design is equipped with jib winches that can be reached from the helm station. The mainsail halyard winch is located on the coachhouse roof and the jib is roller furling. The cockpit can accommodate six people.

Optional equipment includes electric jib winches, a powered mainsheet winch and an electric halyard winch.

See also

List of sailing boat types

Similar sailboats
Alajuela 38
C&C 38
Catalina 38
Catalina 375
Farr 38
Hunter 38
Hunter 376
Hunter 380
Landfall 38
Sabre 38
Shannon 38
Stuart Knockabout
Yankee 38

References

External links

 

Keelboats
2010s sailboat type designs
Sailing yachts
Sailboat type designs by Hoek Design
Sailboat types built by Leonardo Yachts